Arturo "Gonini" Vázquez Ayala (born 26 June 1949) is a Mexican former professional footballer.

Career
Vázquez had an 18-year club football career, playing as a defender for UNAM, C.D. Guadalajara and Atlante F.C. He won the Primera five times.

Vázquez made several appearances for the Mexico national team, and captained the side in the 1978 FIFA World Cup finals in Argentina. He scored a goal, but the team failed to advance from the group stage.

Vázquez was nicknamed "Gonini" after a Renault model popular at the time.

References

External links

 Pumas UNAM Ciudad de Mexico

1949 births
Living people
Footballers from Mexico City
Mexico international footballers
1978 FIFA World Cup players
Club Universidad Nacional footballers
C.D. Guadalajara footballers
Atlante F.C. footballers
Liga MX players
CONCACAF Championship-winning players
Mexican footballers
Association football defenders